The 2005 Philips boxed set, Swingle Singers is a compilation of all eleven of the Paris-based Swingle Singers' recordings made for Philips between 1963 and 1972.  Ten of the eleven disks included in this boxed set had also been re-issued previously by Philips (Emarcy) in five "two-fer" compilation sets over the preceding five years.

Contents
 Disk 1: Jazz Sébastien Bach a.k.a. Bach's Greatest Hits (1963)
 Disk 2: Jazz Sébastien Bach Vol. 2 a.k.a. Back to Bach (1968)
 Disk 3: Noëls Sans Passeport a.k.a. Christmastime (1968)
 Disk 4: Going Baroque / de Bach aux Baroques (1964)
 Disk 5: Swinging Mozart a.k.a. Anyone for Mozart? (1965)
 Disk 6: Les Romantiques a.k.a. Getting Romantic (1965)
 Disk 7: Swingling Telemann a.k.a. Rococo Á Go Go (1966)
 Disk 8: Les Quatre Saisons a.k.a. The Joy of Singing (1972)
 Disk 9: Sounds of Spain: Concerto d'Aranjuez a.k.a. Spanish Masters (1967)
 Disk 10: American Look (1969)
 Disk 11: Place Vendôme a.k.a. Encounter (1966)

Personnel
The Swingle Singers = 8 voices: 2 sopranos, 2 altos, 2 tenors and 2 basses (accompanied by only a drummer and double bassist)
 Christiane Legrand – soprano
 Jeanette Baucomont – soprano (1963–1968)
 Nicole Darde – soprano (1969–1972)
 Claudine Meunier – alto
 Anne Germain – alto (1963–1965)
 Alice Herald – alto (1965–1966)
 Hélène Devos – alto (1967–1972)
 Ward Swingle – tenor, arranger
 Claude Germain – tenor (1963–1966)
 Joseph Noves – tenor (1967–1972)
 Jean Cussac – bass
 Jean Claude Briodin – bass (1963–1964)
 José Germain – bass (1965–1972)
Rhythm section:
 Andre Arpino – drums (1963)
 Gus Wallez – drums (1963–1964)
 Daniel Humair – drums (1965–1968)
 Bernard Lubat – drums (1968)
 Roger Fugen – drums (1969–1972)
 Pierre Michelot – double bass (1963)
 Guy Pedersen – double bass (1964–1968)
 Jacky Cavallero – double bass (1969–1972)
The Modern Jazz Quartet (on Encounter / Place Vendôme only):
 John Lewis – piano
 Milt Jackson – vibraphone
 Percy Heath – double bass
 Connie Kay – drums

Notes / references

 Philips 9826325
 Swingle Singers info at Allmusic.com including [ complete track listing] and general [ discography]
 Disc-by-disc track listing at answers.com

The Swingle Singers albums
2005 compilation albums
Philips Records albums